Catherine Walsh (born 1969) is an Irish actor of stage and screen.

Early life
Born in Cork in 1969, Walsh was educated in the Presentation in the city. She was encouraged in her goal of becoming an actor. She auditioned for the National Youth Theatre and on the advise of one of her directors she then got training in theatre with the Samuel Beckett Centre, Trinity College Dublin.
Walsh's younger sister is the actor Eileen Walsh.

Acting career 
Walsh predominantly performs on stage. She has gained a great reputation for her performances with accolades such as the review for her work in Bailegangaire:

But astonishing too is the performance of Catherine Walsh – which was described by a colleague of mine this morning as flawless. Her physical stance, her movements, her delivery of lines all show that Mary is utterly trapped, perhaps more restricted by circumstances than Mommo is by senility and her bed. I had never understood fully the links between the telling of Mommo’s story and the transformation of Mary until I saw that change being embodied by Walsh.

Awards and criticism
Best Actress award for her performance in Eden at the Irish Times/ESB Theatre Awards 2001

Performances

Stage

 Sharon's Grave
 Werewolves
 Eden
  The Gigli Concert
  Translations
  Kevin's Bed
  Blackwater Angel
  At Swim Two Birds
  Love in the Title
 Dancing at Lughnasa
  A Christmas Carol
  Phaedra
 Buddleia  by Paul Mercier;
 From Both Hips  by Mark O’Rowe;
 Licking the Marmalade Spoon  by David Parnell
 The Chastitute and Big Maggie  by J.B. Keane

Radio

 Eden  by Eugene O’Brien
 The Monotonous Life of Little Ms. P by Enda Walsh
 Swanscross by Gina Moxley.

Screen 

 2015 My Name Is Emily 
 2013 The Stag 
 2004 Holby City (TV Series) 
 1999 The Ambassador (TV Series) 
 1999 The Last September 
 1997 Before I Sleep (Short) 
 1994 Family (TV Mini-Series)

References

External links
 

1970 births
20th-century Irish actresses
21st-century Irish actresses
Irish film actresses
Irish television actresses
Irish stage actresses
Living people
People from County Cork